The La Posa Plain is a wide, generally flat plain in western Arizona near the Colorado River and is on the west and northwest border of the Kofa National Wildlife Refuge. The plain lies to the east of the Colorado River Indian Reservation and east of the Dome Rock and Trigo Mountains. Quartzsite, Arizona, lies on the western part of the plain, which crosses both Interstate 10 and U.S. Route 95.

The Plomosa, New Water and Kofa ranges border to the east. To the south the plain terminates at a drainage divide between the Castle Dome Mountains to the southeast and the Chocolate Mountains to the southwest.

The northern reaches of the plain is crossed by the Bouse Wash west of Bouse and extends on to east of Parker, terminating along the Cactus Plain south of the Buckskin Mountains. Arizona State Route 72 crosses the plain between Bouse and Parker.

References 

 California Road and Recreation Atlas, 2005, p. 114

Plains of Arizona
Landforms of La Paz County, Arizona
Landforms of Yuma County, Arizona
Sonoran Desert